Bonne Femme Township is an inactive township in Howard County, in the U.S. state of Missouri.

Bonne Femme Township was erected in 1821.

References

Townships in Missouri
Townships in Howard County, Missouri